The Royal Gendarmerie of Cambodia (GRK from French Gendarmerie royale khmère; , , UNGEGN: ,) is a branch of the Royal Cambodian Armed Forces and it is responsible for the maintenance of public order and internal security in Cambodia. The paramilitary unit has a strength of 30,000 soldiers deployed in all provinces. Its headquarters is located in Phnom Penh, with the unit's chain of command through the Royal Cambodian Armed Forces High Command. The Gendarmerie is under the direct supervision of a commander with an equivalent rank to Lieutenant-General. The High Command is responsible for monitoring all Gendarmerie units as well as general training. The current Gendarmerie commander is Lieutenant-General Sao Sokha, a former bodyguard and personal advisor to Cambodian Prime Minister Hun Sen.

Duties
The Gendarmerie Royale Khmere duties are:
 Restoring peace and stability if they have been heavily disturbed
 Counter terrorism
 Countering violent groups
 Repressing riots in prisons

Its civil duties include: to provide security and public peace, to investigate and prevent organised crime, terrorism and other violent groups; to protect state and private property; to help and assist civilians and other emergency forces in a case of emergency, natural disaster, civil unrest and armed conflicts.

Its military duties include: to preserve and protect national security, state, property, public peace, and public order, and to assist other security forces in case of emergency, civil unrest, war; to repress riots; to reinforce martial law and mobilisation; to fight and apprehend suspected criminals, terrorists and other violent groups.

Organization 
The Gendarmerie Royale Khmere consists of 10 battalion sized units. Each battalion has between 500 – 1000 policemen. The principal bases are located in Phnom Penh.

The Gendarmerie monitors all the 25 provinces and 186 districts, working with the local people. The unit includes: a mobile team, consisting of six intervention units, an intervention vehicle battalion, a cavalry, and 4 infantry, with bases in Phnom Penh. The Gendarmerie training school is located in Kambol commune, Kandal Province.

Equipment
The standard weapons of the Royal Gendarmerie of Cambodia are the Makarov PMM 9mm pistol, the Type 56-2 assault rifle, the M16A1 assault rifle with the M203 grenade launcher, AKMS assault rifle and the Type 56 assault rifle. Usually PM Officer and drivers are assigned the Type 56-2 and gunners are the PKM general purpose machine gun.

Crew-served or vehicle based weapons include the Type 80 general purpose machine gun on tripod with 250 round boxes and the Type 77 heavy machine gun.

Mounted MP teams often carry at least one B-40 or RPG-7D as well.

Weapons

Vehicles

Aircraft

See also
 List of gendarmeries
 Royal Cambodian Armed Forces
 Royal Cambodian Army
 Royal Cambodian Navy
 Royal Cambodian Air Force

References

External links
 

Military of Cambodia
Military units and formations established in 1970
Gendarmerie
Law enforcement in Cambodia